Aolinpike Gongyuan (Olympic Park) station is an interchange station on Line 8 and Line 15 of the Beijing Subway.

The station was named Olympic Green. It was renamed on December 31, 2021, to use Pinyin, though the English translation are still displayed in brackets underneath.

Location 
It is located in Chaoyang District, Beijing. Outside the station is Olympic Green. The Olympic Green was built for the 2008 Summer Olympics.

Station layout 
Both the line 8 and line 15 stations have underground island platforms.

Exits 
There are 7 exits, lettered B, D, E, F, G, H, and I. Exit F is accessible.

Gallery

See also 
Olympic Green

References

External links

Beijing Subway stations in Chaoyang District
Railway stations in China opened in 2008